Sandra Angelia Hadisiswantoro (born May 11, 1986) is the Miss Indonesia 2008. She was also voted "Miss Favorite" by the audience, beating soap opera star Kartika Indah Pelapory. She is a representative of the East Java province. Once elected as Miss Indonesia, she represented Indonesia in the Miss World 2008 pageant.

Miss Indonesia's CROWN
Sandra Angelia is successor incumbent at 13 May 2008 -5 June 2009 (only 1 year hold the crown) and her crown is given to Miss Indonesia 2009.

Personal life
Hadisiswantoro is the first daughter or second child of Rev. Yusak Hadisiswantoro and Rev. Asti Tanuseputra. Since the age of 13 years, she as an ethnic emigrant Chinese Indonesian had moved to Australia at her young age. Sandra is also the maternal granddaughter of the founder of Bethany Church, Abraham Alex Tanuseputra.

Sandra completed her undergraduate degree at the University of Western Australia, in Perth, Australia, majoring in Architecture.

References

External links
Sandra Angelia – Miss Indonesia 2008

1986 births
Indonesian beauty pageant winners
Indonesian people of Chinese descent
Living people
Indonesian evangelicals
Indonesian Christians
Miss Indonesia winners
Miss World 2008 delegates
People from Perth, Western Australia
People from Surabaya
University of Western Australia alumni
Indonesian emigrants to Australia
People educated at St Hilda's Anglican School for Girls